Hernán Darío Toledo (born 17 January 1996) is an Argentine footballer who plays as a winger for Estudiantes, on loan from Deportivo Maldonado.

Club career
Toledo debuted professionally for Vélez Sarsfield in the 2015 Argentine Primera División season, entering the field in a 0–1 defeat to Estudiantes de La Plata. He scored his first goal in the first division in a 3–0 victory against Argentinos Juniors, for the 2016 Argentine Primera División.

In July 2016, Toledo's federative rights were assigned to Deportivo Maldonado for a reported US$ 7.5 million fee, and he was loaned to Serie A side ACF Fiorentina for one year. After failing to make a single appearance for the side, he moved to Lanús the following 17 February until the end of the season.

On 11 July 2017, Toledo joined La Liga side UD Las Palmas on a one-year loan deal. In August 2018, he was then loaned out to Argentinos Juniors. After appointment of new manager Diego Dabove in January 2019, Toledo wasn't a part of the new managers plans, and was therefore sent back home to Maldonado.

In January 2022, Toledo returned to Argentina, signing a one-year loan deal with Estudiantes, including a purchase option.

Career statistics

References

External links
 
 
 
 
 
 
 Argentine Primera statistics at Fútbol XXI 

Living people
1996 births
People from San Martín Department, Santa Fe
Argentine footballers
Association football midfielders
Sportivo Belgrano footballers
Club Atlético Vélez Sarsfield footballers
Club Atlético Lanús footballers
Deportivo Maldonado players
ACF Fiorentina players
UD Las Palmas players
Argentinos Juniors footballers
Club Atlético Banfield footballers
Estudiantes de La Plata footballers
Argentine Primera División players
Uruguayan Primera División players
La Liga players
Argentine expatriate footballers
Argentine expatriate sportspeople in Uruguay
Argentine expatriate sportspeople in Italy
Argentine expatriate sportspeople in Spain
Expatriate footballers in Uruguay
Expatriate footballers in Italy
Expatriate footballers in Spain
Sportspeople from Santa Fe Province